Paula Parisot (born 1978) is a Brazilian artist and writer.

Life 
Parisot was born in Rio de Janeiro and she studied Industrial Design at the Pontifical Catholic University of Rio de Janeiro before moving to The New School in New York City, where she earned a Master's Degree in Fine Arts. Currently (2016) she lives in São Paulo with her family.

Paula Parisot's first book, A dama da solidão (2007), was a finalist in the short fiction category for the Jabuti Award, Brazil's most prestigious literary award. Her second novel, Gonzos e parafusoswas (2010) inspired a performance that lasted for seven consecutive days in which Parisot confined herself to a room 3 meters by 4 meters, which was a reproduction of the sanatorium at the end of the novel. Parisot's third book, Partir (2013), includes original drawings by Parisot and led to a series of new performances in Guadalajara, Rio de Janeiro, and São Paulo. In 2015, Parisot was featured in the Brazil imprint of Harper's Bazaar.

The first translation of Parisot's work into English will be published by Dalkey Archive Press in 2016, under the title Lady of Solitude. This is the book that took her to the finals of the Jabuti Award in 2007.

Parisot is the co-creator and co-screenwriter, with Jessica Mitrani  of the TV series A Crucigramista, channel ARTE1 - BRAZIL . With the title “America Invertida (America Inverted), the first session uses the language and the logic of crossword puzzles to draw a panorama of art and culture in Latin America.

Parisot has done a series of performances related to her literary work and was hailed by Marina Abramovic who said:  "Original and inventive, Paula Parisot has found a new way to present her books by adding performative elements. In this way she is that the forefront of opening new possibilities for writers, and artists in general. To find different ways of expression, she boldly crossed the borders between writing and performance.” 

Parisot has participated on Bienal do Mercosul (2020) e da BienalSur (2021).

Currently (2023) she lives between Buenos Aires and  São Paulo with her family.

Works

 A dama da solidão, 2007 (Trans. The Lady of Solitude, 2016. Dalkey Archive Press)
 Gonzos e parafusos, 2010
 Partir, 2013
 La invención de La Realidad, 2013

TV

 A crucigramista - America Invertida, 2018 (ARTE1)
 A crucigramista - America Feminizada, 2019 (ARTE1)

Biennials 

 2020 Bienal do Mercosul
 2021 Bienal Sur

References

1978 births
21st-century Brazilian novelists
Living people
21st-century Brazilian women writers
Brazilian women novelists

External Links 

 Revista Parati
 La Nación